Abu Abbas (died 31 August 2009) was a Bangladesh Nationalist Party politician and a Jatiya Sangsad member representing the Netrokona-2 constituency during 1991–1995 and 2004–2006.

In November 2008, the Anti-Corruption Commission filed a case against Abbas accusing him of concealing wealth information.

References

1930s births
2009 deaths
Bangladesh Nationalist Party politicians
5th Jatiya Sangsad members
8th Jatiya Sangsad members
Year of birth missing
Place of birth missing